The plot of the first season of the anime series Hakuoki takes place during the Bakumatsu period in Japan from 1853 and 1867. Chizuru Yukimura, a 16 years-old girl, is searching for her missing father in Kyoto. Her search leads her to encounter bloodthirsty swordsmen that are slayed by fictional iteration of the Shinsengumi. Chizuru learns that Shinsengumi is also looking for her father, Kodo Yukimura, so they allow her to stay with them in exchange for her help in looking for Kodo. During her stay with the Shinsengumi, Chizuru is dragged into war against anti-foreign factions and then learns the existence of Water of Life, a drug developed by her father that increases one's strength but drives them into vampiric being thirsty for blood called Rasetsu. Kodo used the Shinsengumi members as test subjects to complete the elixir. The creation of Rasetsu also earns attention of a group of Oni (Demon) working for the opposing faction who seeks to destroy all Rasetsu, including the Shinsengumi.

The anime is produced by Studio Deen. It is also jointly produced by Asuka Yamazaki, Kazuhiko Hasegawa, and Mitsutoshi Ogura, with music composed by Kow Otani, and the story written by Megumu Sasano, Mitsutaka Hirota, Yoshiko Nakamura, and Osamu Yamasaki.

The opening theme is "Izayoi Namida" by Aika Yoshioka and the ending theme is "Kimi no Kioku" by Mao.

Episode list

References

Hakuoki episode lists